Sebastian From The Little Mermaid (credited as Disney's Sebastian) is the first of three original albums inspired by Disney's The Little Mermaid film. Many of the songs are cover versions of classic calypso or reggae songs. All of the songs are performed by Samuel E. Wright as Sebastian the lobster with the exception of "Dancing Mood" and "Dance the Day Away", which are two of the hit singles written by the album's notable producer, Grammy winner Don Mizell (Ray Charles, "Genius Loves Company" Album of the Year 2005) and performed by Jodi Benson as Ariel, who also joins Sebastian on "Day-O". Jason Marin plays the speaking role of Flounder in the beginning of some tracks. The album was recorded in Jamaica and the reggae group Third World performs rhythm tracks and background vocals.

Track listing
 "Arise" (Michael Cooper)
 "Three Little Birds" (Bob Marley)
 "You Can Get It If You Really Want" (Jimmy Cliff)
 "Music Sweet" (Winston Bailey)
 "Hot, Hot, Hot" (Alphonsus Cassell) 
 "Under the Sea" (Howard Ashman, Alan Menken)
 "Dancing Mood" (Alphonsus Cassell)
 "Dance the Day Away" (Don Mizell, Leonard Jones)
 "Day-O (The Banana Boat Song)" (Irving Burgie, William Attaway)
 "Take This Song" (William Clarke, Micheal Cooper, Stephen Coore, Richard Daley, Kenny Gamble, Cladine Nesbeth, William Stewart)
 "Jamaica Farewell" (Irving Burgie)

Personnel
Sebastian Vocals: Sam Wright
Ariel Vocals: Jodi Benson
Rhythm tracks and background vocals performed by Third World:
Ibo Cooper: synthesizers, background vocals
Cat Coore: guitar, background vocals
Richie Daley: bass
Willie Stewart: drums, percussion
Bunny Rugs Clarke: background vocals
Additional background vocals: Pam Hall, J.C. Lodge, Nadine Sutherland, Judy Emmanuel and Leonard Jones
Additional background vocals on Three Little Birds by the children of St. Johns Preparatory School, Ochos Rios, Jamaica
Dave Madden: trumpet
Glen Dacosta: sax
Bubbles Cameron: trombone

References

The Little Mermaid (franchise)
1990 albums
Walt Disney Records albums
Reggae albums by American artists